"Everything in the World" is a song by Squeeze. It was released in 1993 as the first single from their tenth album, Some Fantastic Place, in the United States and featured prominent falsetto vocals by British artist Chris Braide. "Third Rail" was the first single issued in most other countries.  It was a hit in the U.S. on alternative rock radio, peaking at number nine on the Hot Modern Rock Tracks chart.

Track listing
 "Everything in the World" (4:30)
 "Melody Motel" (live) (4:25)
 "The Truth" (live) (5:05)
 "Walk a Straight Line" (live) (4:11)

External links
Squeeze discography at Squeezenet

Squeeze (band) songs
1993 singles
Songs written by Glenn Tilbrook
Songs written by Chris Difford
1993 songs
A&M Records singles